Julián Sotelo Madrazo (born July 5, 1965 in Santander, Cantabria) is a retired male javelin thrower from Spain, who finished in 20th place (75.34 metres) at the 1992 Summer Olympics in Barcelona, Spain. He set his personal best (78.78 m) in 1992. Sotelo is a seven-time national champion in the men's javelin throw.

Achievements

References
 

1965 births
Living people
Athletes from Cantabria
Sportspeople from Santander, Spain
Spanish male javelin throwers
Athletes (track and field) at the 1992 Summer Olympics
Olympic athletes of Spain
World Athletics Championships athletes for Spain
Mediterranean Games gold medalists for Spain
Mediterranean Games medalists in athletics
Athletes (track and field) at the 1991 Mediterranean Games